Don't Play That Song may refer to:
Don't Play That Song, an album by Aretha Franklin
Don't Play That Song!, an album by Ben E. King, or the title track
"Don't Play That Song (You Lied)", a Ben E. King song also covered by Aretha Franklin

See also
"Don't Play That Song Again", 2000 UK entry to the Eurovision Song Contest
Play That Song (disambiguation)